John Bodden may refer to:

 John Bodden (footballer) (born 1981), Honduran footballer
 John Bodden (sailor) (born 1956), Caymanian sailor